Davdan-e Bala (also Romanized as Dāvdān-e Bālā; also known as Dāvdān-e ‘Olyā) is a village in Bastamlu Rural District, in the Central District of Khoda Afarin County, East Azerbaijan Province, Iran. At the 2006 census, its population was 194, in 40 families.

References 

Populated places in Khoda Afarin County